Israel and Samuel Lupfer Tannery Site and House, also known as Monterey Tannery, is a historic home and tannery located at Toboyne Township in Perry County, Pennsylvania. The site consists of the archaeological remains of a substantial 19th century tanning operation and a stone residence constructed about 1852.

It was listed on the National Register of Historic Places in 2003.

See also 
List of European archaeological sites on the National Register of Historic Places in Pennsylvania
National Register of Historic Places listings in Perry County, Pennsylvania

References 

Houses on the National Register of Historic Places in Pennsylvania
Archaeological sites on the National Register of Historic Places in Pennsylvania
Houses in Perry County, Pennsylvania
Tanneries
National Register of Historic Places in Perry County, Pennsylvania